Nancy Jo Rosenstengel (née Niemeier; born April 15, 1968) is the Chief United States district judge of the United States District Court for the Southern District of Illinois and former Clerk of the Court of the same court.

Biography

Rosenstengel received a Bachelor of Arts degree, cum laude, in 1990 from the University of Illinois at Urbana-Champaign. She received a Juris Doctor, cum laude, in 1993 from the Southern Illinois University School of Law. She was an associate at the law firm of Sandberg, Phoenix & von Gontard from 1993 to 1998, where her practice primarily involved products liability, medical malpractice and Jones Act litigation. From 1998 to 2009, she served as a career law clerk to Judge G. Patrick Murphy of the United States District Court for the Southern District of Illinois. Since 2009, she has served as Clerk of the Court in the same district.

Federal judicial service

On November 7, 2013, President Barack Obama nominated Rosenstengel to serve as a United States District Judge of the United States District Court for the Southern District of Illinois, to the seat being vacated by Judge G. Patrick Murphy, who is assuming senior status on December 1, 2013. On February 6, 2014 her nomination was reported out of committee. Cloture was filed on her nomination on May 6, 2014. On Thursday May 8, 2014 the Senate invoked cloture on her nomination by a 54–42 vote. Later that day, her nomination was confirmed by a 95–0 vote. She received her judicial commission on May 12, 2014. Rosenstengel was sworn in as the judge on May 19, 2014. A formal investiture ceremony occurred on July 2, 2014. She became Chief Judge on April 1, 2019, after Michael Joseph Reagan retired.

See also 
List of first women lawyers and judges in Illinois

References

External links

1968 births
Living people
Illinois lawyers
Judges of the United States District Court for the Southern District of Illinois
Southern Illinois University School of Law alumni
United States district court judges appointed by Barack Obama
University of Illinois Urbana-Champaign alumni
21st-century American judges